The psychologist's fallacy is an informal fallacy that occurs when an observer assumes that his or her subjective experience reflects the true nature of an event. The fallacy was named by William James in the 19th century:

Alternative statements of the fallacy 

Some sources state the psychologist's fallacy as if it were about two people—the observer and the observed—rather than about one observer and a fact. For example,

In this alternative form, the fallacy is described as a specific form of the "similar to me" stereotype: what is unknown about another person is assumed, for simplicity, using things the observer knows about themself. Such a bias leads the observer to presuppose knowledge or skills, or lack of such, possessed by another person. For example, "I (or everyone I know or most people I know) don't know very much about chemistry. Therefore I can assume that this other person knows very little about chemistry." This assumption may be true in any number of specific cases, making inductive reasoning based on this assumption cogent, but is not applicable in the general case (there are many people who are very knowledgeable in the field of chemistry), and therefore deductive reasoning based on this assumption may be invalid.

These alternative statements, however, do not match what William James characterized when he named the fallacy.

See also 

 Historian's fallacy
 Mind projection fallacy

References 

1890 introductions
Informal fallacies